Sofus Johansen (1 November 1900 – 17 May 1974) was a Danish footballer. He played in eight matches for the Denmark national football team from 1925 to 1931.

References

External links
 

1900 births
1974 deaths
Danish men's footballers
Denmark international footballers
Place of birth missing
Association footballers not categorized by position